Rentadick is a 1972 British comedy film, directed by Jim Clark and starring James Booth, Richard Briers, Julie Ege, Ronald Fraser and Donald Sinden. It is a spoof spy/detective picture, the plot of which involves attempts to protect a new experimental nerve gas.

Main cast
 James Booth - Simon Hamilton
 Richard Briers - Miles Gannet
 Julie Ege - Utta Armitage
 Ronald Fraser - Major Upton
 Donald Sinden - Jeffrey Armitage
 Tsai Chin - Madam Greenfly
 Kenneth Cope - West
 John Wells - Owltruss
 Spike Milligan - Customs officer
 Winnie Holman - Maid
 Patsy Crowther - Old Lady
 Patricia Quinn - Chauffeuse
 Michael Rothwell - Removal Man
 Michael Sharvell-Martin - Removal Man
 Richard Beckinsale - Hobbs
 Derek Griffiths - Henson
 Leon Sinden - Police Inspector
 Cheryl Hall - Maxine
 Michael Bentine - Husein
 Penelope Keith - Reporter

Production
The original script for the film was written by Graham Chapman and John Cleese, both of Monty Python. However, the producers made so many changes to the partnership's material (including commissioning additional material from John Fortune and John Wells) that Chapman and Cleese successfully instigated action to have their names removed from the finished print. This left Rentadick with very peculiar on-screen acknowledgements; the only writing credit is given to Fortune and Wells, who are explicitly credited only with "additional dialogue". However, the British company Network released a DVD in 2007 using a print that still shows the names of Cleese and Chapman during the opening titles (frames at 2:00 minutes into the presentation), and uses their names in its promotional material.

References

External links

1972 films
1972 comedy films
British comedy films
Films scored by Carl Davis
Films shot at EMI-Elstree Studios
1970s English-language films
1970s British films